Miles Sound System (MSS), formerly known as Audio Interface Library (AIL), is a sound software system primarily for video games and used mostly as an alternative for low-end audio chipsets. It uses little CPU time while providing adequate audio output. It was originally a middleware driver library for soundcards to use in DOS applications when no viable alternative was available. Epic Games Tools (formerly RAD Game Tools) acquired the technology from Miles Design in 1995.

The 1992 AIL version 2 for DOS has been released by John Miles as open-source (public domain without restrictions) in 2000. The package can be found on his personal site (KE5FX.com) and contains source code for both real-mode and protected-mode programs.

Reception
The Miles Sound System was used in its history by over 7,000 video games across 18 platforms. Computer Gaming World stated in 1994 that "Many of the game publishers have decided to support only those sound cards which are supported by the Miles drivers", especially the Sound Blaster.

References

External links
 Miles Sound System at RAD Game Tools
 KE5FX by John Miles

Audio libraries
Media players
Public-domain software with source code
1991 software